Players and pairs who neither have high enough rankings nor receive wild cards may participate in a qualifying tournament held one week before the annual Wimbledon Tennis Championships.

Seeds

  Mariya Koryttseva /  Darya Kustova (qualified)
  Eleni Daniilidou /  Jasmin Wöhr (qualified)
  Darija Jurak /  Sophie Lefèvre (first round)
  Stéphanie Cohen-Aloro /  Selima Sfar (first round)
  Johanna Larsson /  Yvonne Meusburger (first round)
  Nina Bratchikova /  Vitalia Diatchenko (qualifying competition)
  Jill Craybas /  Marina Erakovic (qualified)
  Katalin Marosi /  Kathrin Wörle (qualifying competition, lucky losers)

Qualifiers

  Mariya Koryttseva /  Darya Kustova
  Eleni Daniilidou /  Jasmin Wöhr
  Kaia Kanepi /  Zhang Shuai
  Jill Craybas /  Marina Erakovic

Lucky losers

  Katalin Marosi /  Kathrin Wörle
  Chang Kai-chen /  Ayumi Morita

Qualifying draw

First qualifier

Second qualifier

Third qualifier

Fourth qualifier

External links

2010 Wimbledon Championships on WTAtennis.com
2010 Wimbledon Championships – Women's draws and results at the International Tennis Federation

Women's Doubles Qualifying
Wimbledon Championship by year – Women's doubles qualifying
Wimbledon Championships